Kingston Beach is a residential locality in the local government area (LGA) of Kingborough in the Hobart LGA region of Tasmania. The 2016 census recorded a population of 1990 for the state suburb of Kingston Beach.

It is a suburb of the greater Hobart area. It is located on the Derwent River at the mouth of Browns Rivulet. It was originally known as Browns River Beach in the 1850s. Kingston Beach was a regularly photographed location in the twentieth century.

The beach is patrolled by Kingston Beach Surf Life Saving Club between the months of December and April. Other facilities include a dog beach, bike park, barbecue area, sailing club, playgrounds and various shops. The local Progress Association served between 1925 and 1992, known as either the Kingston Beach Progress Association, Kingston Beach Regatta Association, or the Kingston Beach Progress and Regatta Association.

History 
Kingston Beach was gazetted as a locality in 1960.

Geography
The waters of the River Derwent estuary form the eastern boundary. Beginning at Tyndall Beach, the Alum Cliffs stretch through the neighbouring suburb of Bonnet Hill to Hinsby Beach at Taroona.

Road infrastructure
Route B68 (Channel Highway) passes to the north-west. From there, several roads provide access to the locality.

Notes

Localities of Kingborough Council
Beaches of Tasmania